Deirdre Gogarty (born 10 November 1969) is a retired Irish female boxer and current coach of the Ragin' Cajun Boxing Club who hails from Drogheda, Ireland.
She attended Drogheda Grammar School. Due to legal issues regarding women's boxing in Ireland at the time, Gogarty could not engage in competition there. She currently fights out of Lafayette, Louisiana and is managed and trained by Beau Williford. However, before the law was passed in Ireland, preventing women from engaging in boxing events, Gogarty was able to begin her career there with a six-round decision win against Anne-Marie Griffin. The law preventing females from participating in the sport of boxing in Ireland has since been revoked and there is an increasing number of females becoming involved with the sport thanks to its Olympic acceptance and the consistent international success of Katie Taylor.

After leaving Ireland, Gogarty's next three fights took her to London and Kansas City, Missouri. In London, she defeated Jane Johnson twice, by a four-round knockout and by and eight-round decision. In Kansas City, she drew after six rounds with Stacy Prestage After the rematch with Johnson, she obtained her first knockout in the first round, beating Jane McGhee. Another win followed this and she was matched with Prestage again, resulting in another draw after six rounds.

Following the emerging pattern, another win followed this tie and she was matched against Prestage for a rubber match. However, this time Gogarty suffered her first loss when Prestage won a ten-round decision over her. Two more wins followed this defeat, including a six-round knockout of the top contender Carol Brown and a first-round knockout win over Missy Buchanan. In spite of this winning streak, Gogarty next lost a six-round decision when she faced Mary Ann Almager.

Gogarty followed this defeat with a win, after which she was matched with Isra Girgrah, who Gogarty knocked out in three rounds. This is considered her biggest win to date. She then boxed another of female boxing's top competitors when she faced Laura Serrano, who beat Gogarty by a knockout in round seven. A knockout win in the first round followed this defeat, when she fought Jessica Breitfelder. Gogarty then participated in the fight many credit as putting female boxing on the sports' fan page: she and Christy Martin faced each other in a six-round match that was televised by Showtime. This fight made the covers of many magazines. Many fans of women's boxing considered it the female version of the Thrilla in Manila. Martin won by a six-round decision.

Gogarty succeeded in winning another three fights consecutively before she challenged Bonnie Canino for the Women's International Boxing Federation's Women's World Featherweight Champtionship. Gogarty became a World Champion after winning the fight on a ten-round decision. She defended her title against Monique Strohman and Debra Strohman. Both were defeated in first-round knockouts. In her last fight to date, Gogarty lost her title to Beverly Szymanski on a ten-round decision.

Gogarty co-wrote her memoir, My Call to the Ring: A Memoir of a Girl Who Yearns to Box, with Darrelyn Saloom. The book was published by Glasnevin Publishing on 8 August 2012. The next day, Katie Taylor won a gold medal for Ireland in the 2012 Summer Olympics, which included women's boxing for the first time.

In 2015, Gogarty was inducted into the Women's International Boxing Hall of Fame in Fort Lauderdale, Florida. The IWBHF was created by founder Sue TL Fox.

Professional boxing record

References

External links
 – official site
 

1969 births
Living people
People from Drogheda
World boxing champions
World featherweight boxing champions
Irish women boxers